"Hungry Eyes" is a song performed by American musician Eric Carmen, a former member of the band Raspberries, and was featured in the film Dirty Dancing (1987). The song was recorded at Beachwood Studios in Beachwood, Ohio in 1987. "Hungry Eyes" peaked at  4 on the Billboard Hot 100 chart and No. 3 on the Cash Box Top 100 in 1988. The power ballad was not released commercially in the UK, but it managed to peak at No. 82 in January 1988, having charted purely on import sales.

Songwriters Franke Previte and John DeNicola wrote the song, as well as another hit from the Dirty Dancing soundtrack, "(I've Had) The Time of My Life". John DeNicola revamped "Hungry Eyes" for his debut album, The Why Because, released in October 2019.

Background
Eric Carmen, the performer of "Hungry Eyes", had been the vocalist of the Raspberries. Carmen released his first solo album Eric Carmen, which contained the worldwide hit "All by Myself".

"Hungry Eyes" was his biggest hit and was written in 1984 by John DeNicola and Franke Previte. It was originally recorded by Previte's band, Frankie and The Knockouts for their album Makin' the Point. Jimmy Ienner, the producer of Carmen's band from his early career, The Raspberries, asked him to sing this song for the Dirty Dancing album because he was familiar with Carmen's musical style. Carmen was initially hesitant to produce a song for another film sound track because he believed that soundtrack music died "horrible deaths".

Music video
The music video featured Carmen with model Sally Steele, who later founded Vegas Rocks! Magazine.

Releases
The song was released commercially on 7" vinyl in many countries; plus, a 3-track 12" maxi single and 2-track cassette were produced. CD singles were a relatively new format; however, a 2-track Japanese mini CD single was commercially released in 1988.

Track listing

Charts

Weekly charts

Eyeopener cover

Year-end charts

Certifications

Cover versions
British dance group Eyeopener covered "Hungry Eyes" and released it as a single on 8 November 2004. Their version reached number 16 in the UK and number 25 in Ireland.

A reworked version with altered lyrics by James Radford appeared in a 2017 commercial for Sheba cat food in the UK. John Denicola released his own version in 2019 on his debut album "The Why Because" on Omad Records. It reached number 22 on Billboard's Adult Contemporary Chart.

The band TOBACCO covered the song in 2020.

References

1987 singles
1988 singles
Eric Carmen songs
Songs from Dirty Dancing
Rock ballads
Pop ballads
Song recordings produced by Bob Gaudio
Songs written by Franke Previte
1987 songs
Songs written by John DeNicola
Arista Records singles
RCA Records singles
1980s ballads